Donna Singer (born 1965) is an American jazz vocalist. She has reached the top 50 charts for various national and international terrestrial radio stations. Her music has been recognized in the United States, Canada, the United Kingdom, Australia, South Africa, the Netherlands, Norway, and Japan. She performs a variety of songs from classic jazz composers such as George Gershwin and Arthur Hamilton, as well as original works by her husband, pianist and composer Roy Singer.

Donna's Jazz Quartet was recognized by Uncool, an international Artist in Residence program for talented musicians. Singer is a voting member of the Recording Academy, the organization that presents the Grammy Awards. Her record label, Emerald Baby Recording Company released her nine CD's six with the Doug Richards Trio and three with the Ranses Colon Trio. Her publicist is Kari-On Productions, a jazz, world and classical radio promotion company out of Evans, Georgia.

Personal life 
Donna Singer was born in 1965 in the Bronx, New York City. She and her twin sister, Dawn, were raised into a family of jazz enthusiasts who listened to the music of Dinah Washington, Nancy Wilson, Sammy Davis Jr., Count Basie, Lena Horne, and many others.

She graduated from the New York Academy of Theatrical Arts and had formal training at the Juilliard School.

After giving birth to Christopher in 1991, Singer began working steadily as the pianist and Music Minister with the First Baptist Church of Monticello. In the early 1990s, She started performing with songwriter Roy Singer. They were married in 1997. Roy became the organist at the church while she continued to play the piano for over 17 years.

Career 
In 1998, Singer began hosting a weekly gospel show called "Down by the River" on WJFF 90.5FM, a public radio station in Jeffersonville, New York. She hosted the show for six years. In the interim, she recorded two solo gospel albums: Hymns of God (1996) and Gospel Voices of Tomorrow (1997). The two albums and An Intimate Christmas Night (1995) were released on the DRC Independent Record Label.

In 2010, she began collaborating with Doug Richards. Together, they released 4 jazz albums. The Doug Richards Trio includes Doug Richards (bass), a highly applauded jazz musician who worked with Erskine Hawkins of Tuxedo Junction, Billy Alfred (piano) musical director for 20 years at the Pines Hotel in South Fallsburg, and Mike Cervone (drums) who toured with Gavin DeGraw.

In 2019, she began collaborating on three albums, with the Ranses Colon Trio, with Ranses Colon (bass) of Venezuela and he was principal bass with the Miami Chamber Orchestra and Brad Keller. (piano) who performed at the Montreux Jazz Festival and his father is jazz pianist Jack Keller, and Adolfo Herrera (drums) of Venezuela, who has a solo CD IRREPETIBLE, improvised music over poems.

The Doug Richards Trio 
In 2012, Singer released her first album with the Doug Richards Trio, Take the Day Off: Escape with Jazz, which combined both jazz standards as well as original instrumental tracks. The debut album aired on over 150 stations globally. This album included Donna and Roy Singers' first original release, the self-titled track “Take the Day Off”. "Take the Day Off" was written by Mitch Uscher and Roy Singer. The album reached No. 23 on the College Music Journal's jazz charts, and reached No. 20 the following week.

In November 2012, Singer and Doug Richards’ next collaborative effort, Kiss Me Beneath the Mistletoe, was released as a holiday jazz album. The album featured several original Christmas songs including the self-titled, "Kiss Me Beneath the Mistletoe" and "On New Year’s Eve", both written by Roy Singer, and "Christmas In My Heart", written by Doug Richards. The Christmas album reached No. 20 on the College Music Journal jazz charts.

Guest artists for this album included: Jeff Otis (guitar), Luis Camacho (trumpet/vocal), Crystal Tweed (alto vocal), as well as Debra Courtright (soprano vocal) and Randy Hennig (tenor vocal) of the Diamond Express Trio.

In 2013, Singer and the Doug Richards Trio performed at the SaratogaArtsFest as well as various venues in the Catskill Mountains and NYC.

The original and first album to be recorded by Singer and The Doug Richards Trio was released in 2013, entitled Jazz in the Living Room. 

The fourth "Donna and Doug" album, Destiny: Moment of Jazz, was released in 2014. Special guests on this album include Jeff Otis (guitar), Chris Pasen (flugelhorn), Nancy Wegrzyn (viola), and Bobby Tee (percussion/drums). Destiny: Moment of Jazz reached #25 on the College Music Journal jazz station, and #40 during its release month of August 2014. Destiny: Moment of Jazz was submitted to the Recording Academy for a Grammy nomination. Dianne Reeves' album Beautiful Life received the Grammy that year.

Doug Richards Trio: The duo's fifth album, Feeling The Jazz was released in 2016. Special guests on this album include Jeff Otis (guitar), William Fleck (trombone), Karen Macklin (Have You Ever Had The Feeling, composure/violin), Siavani Bacani, (violin) Ysauro Hernandez (percussion) Valerie Solomon (graphic design).

In 2018, before the passing of Richards, Singer and Richards were able to release one final children's jazz album, 'It's An Art To Follow Your Heart''' Their sixth album entirely written by Roy Singer (composer) and Carole Belle (lyricist and author).

In 2014, Singer and the Doug Richards Trio performed at the Nebraska International Jazz Series, also known as the Jazz in June concert series, which took place in Lincoln, Nebraska. The group performed on the East Coast at various venues including the Newburgh Jazz Series, University of the Streets Jazz Theatre on Charlie Parker Way in the East Village, Somethin' Jazz – 52nd Street, NYC, The World-famous Shrine and Billie's Black Gourmet Restaurant – Harlem.

 Other domestic collaborations 
Singer created the educational program: Jazz In Our Schools: Black History Program for New York State high schools and elementary schools promoting black history in the entertainment business in the 1950s and 1960s.

Singer performed for 15 years as the lead vocalist in the Swing Shift Orchestra in the Catskill Mountains, a 17-piece big band featuring the music of Count Basie, Glenn Miller, Tommy Dorsey and many more. She is heard on the Swing Shift Orchestra CD On Fire''.

Singer performed with The Gold Coast Community Band featuring soloist Maestro Ken Wilbanks and his 100-piece orchestra. The performance celebrated the band's 40th anniversary. She now performs with their new director, Barbara Rubenstein.

In 2015, Singer performed the National Anthem at Sunrise Stadium for the 50th anniversary NFL game for the Miami Dolphins as a part of a chorus of 50 women singing in 4 part harmony. She also participated in the Fall Heartland Tour, centered around the Bethany College Jazz Festival and Iola Music Series in Kansas.

In 2016, Singer performed with the Donna Singer Trio, featuring Singer on vocals, Billy Alfred on piano, and Hunter Isbell on bass, at the United Methodist Church of the Palm Beaches in West Palm Beach, Florida for Jazz in the Afternoon.

International work

In the summer of 2016, Singer performed at the Uncool Artist in Residence program in Torino, Italy and Poschiavo, Switzerland. As a part of Donna's Jazz Quartet, she performed with husband Roy Singer on piano, Hunter Isbel on bass, and William Fleck on trombone.

Charity work 
In New York, Singer organized and performed various fundraisers for charities, including St. Baldwick's Day: Event for Childhood Cancer, the Michael J. Fox Foundation for Parkinson's Research, The Sullivan County Federation for the Homeless Jazz Benefit Concert, and the Youth Economic Group in Liberty NY Sunday Jazz Brunch. She also volunteered for the Women's History Month Jazz Brunch at the Dancing Cat Saloon in Bethel, NY.

Discography

References

External links 

1965 births
Living people
American jazz singers
People from the Bronx
American women jazz singers
Smooth jazz singers
Jazz musicians from New York (state)
21st-century American women